John Tavener (1944–2013) was an English composer.

John Tavener may also refer to:

John Tavener (American football) (1921–1993), American football player
John Tavener (baseball) (1897–1969), American baseball player

See also
John Taverner (disambiguation)